The Al Faw Palace (also known as the Water Palace) is located in Baghdad approximately 5 km (3.1 mi) from the Baghdad International Airport, Iraq. Saddam Hussein commissioned its construction in the 1990s to commemorate the Iraqi forces' re-taking of the Al-Faw Peninsula during the Iran-Iraq conflict.

Overview
Al Faw Palace is situated on a former resort complex about 5 kilometers from the Green Zone, which is now referred to as the International Zone or IZ. The complex contains numerous villas and smaller palaces and is now one of the largest US/Coalition bases in Iraq (Camp Victory/ Camp Liberty). The palace contains over 62 rooms and 29 bathrooms. Many of the rooms were converted to serve as offices, and after 2004 the Palace was used as the headquarters for the Multi-National Force - Iraq (MNF-I), along with the Joint Operations Center (JOC), which served for years as 'Mission Control' for the Multi-National Corps - Iraq (MNC-I) and all operational aspects of Operation Iraqi Freedom.  There is an artificial lake surrounding the palace that has a special breed of large bass dubbed the Saddam bass, as well as large carp. Saddam formerly used the palace for duck-hunting expeditions.

Because of the very light damage to the Al Faw Palace and other structures located on what was Camp Victory, it is widely presumed that the planners of the 2003 invasion intended that this area would be used as a headquarters and main base area following the capture and occupation of Baghdad. The palace is surrounded by high walls with preconstructed security towers, which contributes to more readily maintaining surveillance and security for the former resort.

In 2009, comedian Stephen Colbert hosted a week of The Colbert Report from the palace in partnership with United Service Organizations.

See also
 Al-Faw Peninsula
 Administrative districts in Baghdad

Notes

External links

Pike, John. "Abu Ghurayb Presidential Site." Global Security, 2000-2008
Saddam's Palaces: An Interview with Richard Mosse June 2009
The Fish at Al-Faw Palace website created 2009

Buildings and structures in Baghdad
Saddam Hussein
Palaces in Iraq